Error is the third studio album by Mexican rock band The Warning. It was released on 24 June 2022 by Lava Records. The song "Money" reached the top 40 on the Billboard Mainstream Rock Airplay chart.

Background
Error is The Warning's first full-length album to be released via Lava Records, with which the band signed a multi-album deal in 2020. The first song to be released from the recording sessions was "Choke" in May 2021. Six of the album's songs had previously been released on the EP Mayday in October 2021. The first of the new songs, "Money", was released as a preview single in March 2022. The band describes the album as "about how we perceive the world as a generation and how we experience things in this new age – Love, technology, social life, media, politics; losing our sense of humanity and everything in between.”

Critical reception

Critical appraisal of the album, though limited, has been positive. One reviewer commented, "The Warning is a band on the warpath, spearheading an album with so much lyrical and musical energy. Their sound has a mix of well-tuned guitar parts which are electrifying and atmospheric, and on their album Error, the trio become titans of their art." Alternative Press called the album "a rock radio-ready beast". Loudwire included the album in its list of the 50 best rock and metal albums of 2022.

Track listing

Personnel 
The Warning
 Daniela Villarreal – guitar, lead vocals, piano
 Paulina Villarreal – drums, backing and lead vocals, piano
 Alejandra Villarreal – bass guitar, piano, backing vocals

Production
 David Bendeth – producer, mixing, arrangements
 Rick Carson, Mike Ferretti – engineers
 Bobby Huff, Jaren Sorenson – editing
 John Bender – vocal editing
 Ted Jensen – mastering

References

2022 albums
Republic Records albums
Alternative rock albums by Mexican artists
Lava Records albums